Adelaide tram may refer to:

Glenelg tram line
Trams in Adelaide